Misa Eguchi and Eri Hozumi were the defending champions, but chose not to participate.

Jessica Moore and Storm Sanders won the title, defeating Alison Bai and Lizette Cabrera in the final, 6–3, 6–4.

Seeds

Draw

References 
 Draw

Canberra Tennis International - Doubles
2016 in Australian tennis
2016